Boganmargarya is a genus of freshwater snails in the family Viviparidae. There is one species in this genus: Boganmargarya huberi.

References

 Thach, N. N. (2018). New shells of South Asia. Seashells-Landsnails-Freshwater Shells. 3 New Genera, 132 New Species & Subspecies. 48HRBooks Company, Akron, Ohio, USA. 173 pp.

Viviparidae